The Stimulator is a dry fly popularized by angler, fly tyer and author Randall Kaufmann to imitate large adult stoneflies.

Origin
The Stimulator pattern is a derivative of earlier stonefly patterns—the Improved Sofa Pillow (1940s) and Yellow-bellied Mattress Trasher (1970s).  Many anglers believe the name Stimulator  was given to the pattern by Jim Slattery, a Montana angler who renamed his  Fluttering Stonefly  pattern.  Others contend the pattern was derived from the Trude  style dry flies developed in 1903.  However, the pattern was clearly popularized and promoted by Randall Kaufmann, a fly shop owner, angler and author in Seattle, WA and Portland, OR in the 1980s.

Imitates
Originally tied to imitate large stoneflies, the Stimulator is also useful to imitate adult caddis, grasshoppers and large mayflies.

Materials
 Hook: 3X Long Curved Dry Fly Size 6-18
 Thread: 6/0 or 140 denier matching color to pattern
 Tail: Elk, Deer or Moose hair
 Body: Dry fly dubbing matching color to pattern
 Ribbing: Short dry fly hackle palmered, typically grizzly or brown
 Wing: Deer or Elk hair
 Thorax: Dry fly dubbing matching color to pattern
 Hackle: Dry fly hackle, typically grizzly or brown

Variations
As described in Fly Patterns--Tie Thousands of Flies (2008), Randall and Mary Kaufmann
 Crystal Stimulator (Black, Gold, Green, Orange Peacock, Pearl, Royal Cerise, Tan, Yellow)
 Kaufmann's Stimulator (Green, Orange, Yellow)
 Kaufmann's Stimulator RL (Rubber Legs), (Gray, Lime, Orange, Pearl, Royal, Tan, Yellow)

Notes

Dry fly patterns